Li Haoran may refer to:

Li Haoran (footballer, born 1993)
Li Haoran (footballer, born 1999)